Mannophryne is a genus of frogs native to Venezuela and Trinidad and Tobago. They are sometimes known as the fingered poison frogs. This genus was created in 1992 and corresponds to the former Colostethus trinitatis species group. All species have a dark throat collar.

Species
Mannophryne contains 20 species, many of which used to be classified in the genus Colostethus:

References

 
Aromobatidae
Amphibians of the Caribbean
Amphibians of South America
Amphibian genera